Yakupitiyage Gunatilleke Jayasinghe (4 December 1907 – ?) was a Ceylonese politician. He was the member of the Parliament of Ceylon representing the Lanka Sama Samaja Party for the Bandarawela electorate.

He was the chairman of the Ettampitiya Council.

He contested the 2nd parliamentary election, held in May 1952, for the seat of Bandarawela as the Lanka Sama Samaja Party candidate. He lost the contest by 4,126 votes to the United National Party candidate, K. D. Sugathadasa.

Jayasinghe ran again at the 3rd parliamentary election, held in April 1956. This time he was successful, polling 6,805 votes (63% of the total vote), 4,143 votes clear of Sumanadasa Ratnayake, the United National Party candidate.

At the 4th parliamentary election, held on 19 March 1960, Jayasinghe contested the newly created Sorantota electorate. He failed in his attempt to capture the seat, finishing third in a field of eight, losing to K. Y. M. Wijeratne Banda of the Sri Lanka Freedom Party by 2,387 votes, only securing 1,434 votes (14% of the total vote). He did not run at the subsequent parliamentary election in July 1960.

References

20th-century Sri Lankan politicians
Members of the 3rd Parliament of Ceylon
Lanka Sama Samaja Party politicians
Sinhalese politicians
1907 births
Year of death missing
Date of death missing